German submarine U-669 was a Type VIIC U-boat of Nazi Germany's Kriegsmarine during World War II. The submarine was laid down on 3 November 1941 at the Howaldtswerke yard at Hamburg, launched on 5 October 1942, and commissioned on 16 December 1942 under the command of Oberleutnant zur See d.R. Kurt Köhl.

Attached to 5th U-boat Flotilla based at Kiel, U-669 completed her training period on 31 May 1943 and was assigned to front-line service.

Design
German Type VIIC submarines were preceded by the shorter Type VIIB submarines. U-669 had a displacement of  when at the surface and  while submerged. She had two shafts and two  propellers.

U-669 was fitted with five  torpedo tubes (four fitted at the bow and one at the stern), fourteen torpedoes, one  SK C/35 naval gun, 220 rounds, and two twin  C/30 anti-aircraft guns. The boat had a complement of between forty-four and sixty.

Service history
On the second war patrol U-669 went missing in the Bay of Biscay since 30 August 1943. The U-boat had left St. Nazaire on 29 August and had not been heard of since. Subsequently, U-669 and her crew of 52 was declared missing on 8 September 1943.

Previously recorded fate
U-669 was originally thought to have been sunk on September 7, 1943 in the Bay of Biscay at position  by depth charges from a Canadian aircraft. This attack was actually against , inflicting no damage.

References

Bibliography

External links

German Type VIIC submarines
1942 ships
Ships built in Hamburg
U-boats commissioned in 1942
U-boats sunk in 1943
Maritime incidents in September 1943
Missing U-boats of World War II
World War II submarines of Germany